Sawang Daen Din is a district (amphoe) in the western part of Sakon Nakhon province, northeast Thailand.

Geography
Neighboring districts are (from the north clockwise) Charoen Sin, Wanon Niwat, Phang Khon, Waritchaphum, and Song Dao of Sakon Nakhon Province, Chai Wan, Nong Han, Thung Fon, and Ban Dung of Udon Thani province.

History
The district dates back to Mueang Sawang Daen Din, which was converted into an amphoe during the Thesaphiban administrative reforms around 1900.

In 1939 it was renamed Sawang Daen Din.

Administration

Central administration 
Sawang Daen Din is divided into 16 sub-districts (tambons), which are further subdivided into 189 administrative villages (mubans).

Missing numbers are tambon which now form Charoen Sin District.

Local administration 
There are seven sub-district municipalities (thesaban tambons) in the district:
 Don Khueang consisting of parts of sub-district Waeng.
 Sawang Daen Din consisting of parts of sub-district Sawang Daen Din.
 Bong Tai consisting of sub-district Bong Tai.
 Ban Tai consisting of sub-district Ban Tai.
 Khok Si consisting of sub-district Khok Si.
 Nong Luang consisting of sub-district Nong Luang.
 Phan Na consisting of sub-district Phan Na.

There are 11 subdistrict administrative organizations (SAO) in the district:
 Sawang Daen Din consisting of parts of sub-district Sawang Daen Din.
 Kham Sa-at consisting of sub-district Kham Sa-at.
 Bong Nuea consisting of sub-district Bong Nuea.
 Phon Sung consisting of sub-district Phon Sung.
 Kho Tai consisting of sub-district Kho Tai.
 Waeng consisting of parts of the sub-district Waeng.
 Sai Mun consisting of sub-district Sai Mun.
 Tan Kon consisting of sub-district Tan Kon.
 Tan Noeng consisting of sub-district Tan Noeng.
 That Thong consisting of sub-district That Thong.
 Ban Thon consisting of sub-district Ban Thon.

References

External links
amphoe.com

Sawang Daen Din